Castel San Giorgio is a town and comune in the province of Salerno in the Campania region of south-western Italy. In 2011, it had a population of 13,411.

History
The town, founded in 1810 and located near the site of the ancient Nuceria Alfaterna, was originally named San Giorgio, until 1861.

Geography
The municipality borders with Mercato San Severino, Nocera Inferiore, Roccapiemonte, Sarno and Siano.

It counts eleven hamlets (frazioni): Aiello, Campomanfoli, Castelluccio, Cortedomini, Fimiani, Lanzara (the most populated one), Santa Croce, Santa Maria a Favore, Taverna-Casalnuovo, Torello and Trivio Codola (also named Codola).

Demographics

Transport
The municipality has 3 train stations (Castel San Giorgio-Roccapiemonte, Lanzara-Fimiani and Codola), on the line Mercato San Severino-Nocera Inferiore/Sarno. It is also served by the motorway A30 Salerno-Caserta, at the exit "Castel San Giorgio".

Twin towns
 Mella, Cuba
 Šmartno pri Litiji, Slovenia

References

External links

Cities and towns in Campania